Filip Yanev (born 10 March 1982) is a Bulgarian gymnast. He competed at the 2004 Summer Olympics where he placed fifth in the vault final.

References

External links
 

1982 births
Living people
Bulgarian male artistic gymnasts
Olympic gymnasts of Bulgaria
Gymnasts at the 2004 Summer Olympics
Gymnasts from Sofia